Decker is an unincorporated community, in the town of Belgium, Ozaukee County, Wisconsin, United States.

History
The community was named for the Decker family, early landowners.

Notes

Unincorporated communities in Ozaukee County, Wisconsin
Unincorporated communities in Wisconsin